The 1960 NFL season was the 41st regular season of the National Football League.

Before the season, 33-year-old Pete Rozelle, the general manager of the Los Angeles Rams, was elected NFL commissioner as a compromise choice on the twenty-third ballot. Also, the Cardinals relocated from Chicago to St. Louis and became the St. Louis Cardinals, the same moniker as the major league baseball team.

This loss was Vince Lombardi's only post-season defeat as an NFL head coach. Following this loss in 1960, Lombardi's Packers won five NFL championship games in seven years, and easily won the first two Super Bowls.

The NFL introduced the Playoff Bowl, a game for third place between the runners-up from each conference.
Played at the Orange Bowl in Miami, Florida, after the NFL Championship game, it benefitted the players' pension fund. The Detroit Lions played the Cleveland Browns in the inaugural game and the Lions won by a point, the first of three straight wins by Detroit in the series.

The two-time defending league champion Baltimore Colts led the Western Conference after their bye in Week 9, but lost the last four games to finish at .500 and fourth in the West. The New York Giants, winners of the Eastern Conference the previous two seasons, won only one of their final five games and finished third in the East.

During this season, the American Football League (AFL) was launched as a competitor to the NFL.

Draft
The 1960 NFL Draft was held on November 30, 1959 at Philadelphia's Warwick Hotel. With the first pick, the Los Angeles Rams selected running back Billy Cannon from Louisiana State University.

Because the league awarded the Dallas Cowboys franchise about two months later on January 28, 1960, this marked the only time that an NFL expansion team did not have the benefit of a college draft in its first year.

Expansion Draft
The 1960 NFL expansion draft was held on March 13, 1960, with the Dallas Cowboys selecting 36 players from the other 12 teams.

Conference races
All teams but Dallas played a home-and-away game against the other five members of their own conference, one inter-conference game, and one game against the new team (Dallas): Dallas, although assigned to the Western Conference, were a "swing team" and played each team once. 

This was the final season for the 12-game schedule in the NFL.

A bye was required because of there being thirteen teams, with one team having a bye in each of the 13 weeks. 

The Cowboys' first game saw them take a 14–0 lead over the Pittsburgh Steelers on a Saturday night at the Cotton Bowl, with Jim Doran catching a pass from Eddie LeBaron for the first score, but lost 35–28.

Eastern

Philadelphia lost its opener at home to Cleveland, 41–24, then went on a nine-game winning streak. The breakthrough came in Week Six on October 30, when unbeaten New York (3–0–1), two-time defending conference champions, came off their bye and lost at home to St. Louis, 20–13, while the Browns and idle Eagles were both at 4–1. In Week Seven, New York beat Cleveland, 17–13, and the Eagles beat Pittsburgh 34–7.  The Eagles clinched the Eastern Conference after ten games at 9–1; they dropped a game the next week in the snow at Pittsburgh, and finished the regular season at 10–2, 1½ games ahead of Cleveland. Two of the wins in the streak were in consecutive games (November 20 and 27) against New York. 

In the latter game, the Eagles trailed 17–0, then 23–17, before Norm Van Brocklin threw two touchdown passes in the final quarter for a 31–23 victory. In the former, the Giants' Frank Gifford was severely injured in a tackle by linebacker Chuck Bednarik late in the game  that almost ended his career. New York entered that November 20 game at 5–1–1, but won only once in the last five games, including a tie against Dallas - the Cowboys lost their remaining eleven games that year - and finished third in the Eastern at 6–4–2. The Giants won the next three conference championships for five in six seasons, but not the league title.

Western
The Western Conference race was one in which Baltimore, Chicago, Detroit, Green Bay, and San Francisco all had a lead at one time. 

The Bears fell back after a Week Six loss to the 49ers, 25–7. In Week Seven, the 4–2 Colts and the 4–1 Packers met on November 6 in Green Bay. Two-time defending NFL champion Baltimore, which had lost an earlier match, won 38–24, to take the lead in the Western. In Week Ten, the Colts (6–2) came off their bye and lost at home to San Francisco, 30–22, to begin a streak of four defeats. Baltimore's 20–15 loss to the Lions, and Green Bay's 41–13 win at Chicago, tied the Colts and Packers at 6–4 in Week Eleven. After the Packers' 13–0 win at San Francisco, their record was 7–4, while the Colts, Lions and 49ers were all at 6–5. While San Francisco and Detroit both won the next week, the former beating Baltimore 34–10, the Packers had won the day before, beating Los Angeles 35–21 for the Western title, their first in 16 years.

The new Dallas Cowboys lost their first ten games, but managed a 31–31 tie against the Giants at Yankee Stadium in New York on December 4.

Conference leaders

 A bye was required in 1960, as the league had an odd number  of teams (13); one team had the bye each week.

Final standings

Postseason

NFL Championship Game

Philadelphia 17, Green Bay 13 at Franklin Field, University of Pennsylvania, in Philadelphia, Pennsylvania, on Monday, December 26.

Playoff Bowl
The Playoff Bowl was between the conference runners-up, for third place in the league. This was its first year (of ten) and it was played three weeks after the regular season.
Detroit 17, Cleveland 16 at the Orange Bowl in Miami, Florida, on Saturday, January 7, 1961.

Pro Bowl

West 35, East 31 at the Los Angeles Memorial Coliseum in Los Angeles, California, on Sunday, January 15, 1961.

Awards

Coaching changes
Dallas Cowboys: Tom Landry became the expansion team's first head coach.
Los Angeles Rams: Sid Gillman was replaced by Bob Waterfield.

Stadium changes
 The expansion Dallas Cowboys began play at the Cotton Bowl
 The relocated St. Louis Cardinals moved to Busch Stadium (Sportsman's Park)

See also
1960 American Football League season

References

External links
NFL Record and Fact Book
NFL History 1951–1960 (Last accessed July 8, 2007)
Total Football: The Official Encyclopedia of the National Football League

National Football League seasons